Shariff Abdullah (born Sherwood James Sanders; March 24, 1951) is an attorney, academic, and writer.

He works in the field of social, cultural and spiritual transformation. He is a proponent of an inclusive global human society. Shariff Abdullah teaches groups and individuals how to understand and practice inclusivity – the connection with all beings.

Abdullah's writings include The Power of One: Authentic Leadership in Turbulent Times and Creating a World That Works for All. He is the founder and president of Commonway Institute, the originator of the Commons Café and the Common Society Movement.

Early years
Abdullah was born Sherwood James Sanders on March 24, 1951, in Philadelphia, Pennsylvania, and reared in Camden, New Jersey.

Abdullah received a BA in Psychology from Clark University and earned a juris doctor degree from Boston University School of Law.

Abdullah passed the bar exam in North Carolina in 1977 and began practicing law with Legal Services of the Southern Piedmont (based in Charlotte, North Carolina).

Work with Sarvodaya in Sri Lanka
Since 1996, Abdullah has worked with Sarvodaya Shramadana Sangamaya (Sarvodaya). He currently volunteers as a senior advisor to Sarvodaya.

Academic positions

Adjunct professor at Portland State University in the Philosophy/Conflict Resolution department.

Bibliography
 
  Winner of the 1999 "Book of the Year" award from the Independent Book Publishers Association (Current Affairs).
Abdullah, Shariff. "The Soul of a Terrorist: Reflections on Our War with "The Other", Chapter Seven in The Psychology of Terrorism (Volume I of four volumes). Greenwood Press, 2002  WorldCat
Abdullah, Shariff and Beegle, Donna. "The Class Continuum" Communication Across Barriers, 2006.

References

Clark University alumni
Living people
1951 births
Portland State University faculty
Lewis & Clark College faculty
Marylhurst University alumni
American lawyers